Maryville is a city in and the county seat of Blount County, Tennessee, and is a suburb of Knoxville. Its population was 31,907 at the 2020 census.

It is included in the Knoxville Metropolitan Area and is a short distance from popular tourist destinations such as the Great Smoky Mountains National Park, Dollywood, Gatlinburg, and Pigeon Forge.

History
When the first European explorers arrived in the area, they found the Great Indian Warpath, which ran along the route where the modern US-411 has been built. The trail was long used by the indigenous peoples of the area. A historic Cherokee village known as "Elajay" was situated at the confluence of Ellejoy Creek (named after the village) and the Little River. Its site was near the modern Heritage High School. Ensign Henry Timberlake passed through the village in 1762 while returning from his expedition to the Overhill villages to the west. He reported that it had been abandoned.

In 1785, Revolutionary War veteran John Craig built a wooden palisade enclosing cabins at what is known as Fort Craig (or Craig's Station) in present-day Maryville. Such stations were built throughout the frontier to defend settlers against attacks from the Cherokee. For example, "on April 11, 1793, when settlers believed Indian attacks were imminent, 280 men, women, and children gathered in small huts at John Craig's station on Nine Mile Creek."

Craig donated  next to his fort for the founding of a new town. Incorporated as a city on July 11, 1795, the settlement was named in honor of Mary Grainger Blount, wife of the territorial governor William Blount. Blount County was named after him.

The family of Sam Houston moved to Maryville from Virginia in 1808, when Houston was 15. His older brothers put him to work as a clerk in a store they established in town, but he ran away. Houston lived for a few years with the Cherokee at Hiwassee Island, on the Hiwassee River, where he became fluent in their language and appreciative of their culture. After his return to Maryville about 1811, Houston started a one-room schoolhouse. He signed up for the army during the War of 1812 and rose rapidly in rank, beginning his military and political career. The schoolhouse still stands just off US-411 near the community of Wildwood.

Maryville was a center of abolitionist activity throughout the early 19th-century; it was generated mostly by the Society of Friends, which had a relatively large presence in Blount County. They were supported by anti-slavery advocates such as Isaac L. Anderson, the founder of Maryville College. When Tennessee voted on the Ordinance of Secession in 1861, only 19 percent of Blount Countians voted in favor of seceding from the Union.

Although staunchly pro-Union throughout the Civil War, Maryville was not liberated by federal troops until May 1864. In August of that year, a Confederate cavalry raid, under the command of General Joseph Wheeler, attacked the courthouse where the Union troops had taken shelter. To try to dislodge the federal soldiers, Confederates set fire to several buildings, including a store where the city's records were being kept. Polly Tool, an African-American slave, rescued most of the records. She was honored by a statue in the Blount County courthouse. In the Reconstruction Era Maryville became a hub of Radical Republican activity for East Tennessee. Its local Union League provided a lively forum for political discussion, and the Freedmen's Normal Institute was established on the present-day site of Maryville High School. The city elected William Bennett Scott Sr., the country's second African-American mayor, in 1869.

Maryville is home to one of 24 Alcoa Care-free Homes built in the United States in 1957-1958.

In the 1970s, after several department stores and other retailers moved from the downtown area to Alcoa's Midland shopping center, the city spent $10 million on a renewal project called "Now Town". Traffic was re-routed, facades were placed on old buildings, slums were cleared, and the Bicentennial Greenbelt Park was created. The project failed to attract business back to the downtown locations; instead retailers moved to the new Foothills Mall a few years later. The downtown area remained in decline until the 2000s, when the city agreed to reverse many of the "Now Town" changes.

U.S. Senator Lamar Alexander was born in Maryville in 1940. Alexander served as Governor of Tennessee from 1979–1987 and Secretary of Education (1991–1993) under President George H. W. Bush. He ran unsuccessful campaigns for president in 1996 and 2000, both times announcing his candidacy for the Republican Party from his hometown of Maryville. In 2002, he was elected to the U.S. Senate, succeeding Fred Thompson.

On July 2, 2015, a CSX freight train carrying hazardous materials went off of its tracks. Over 5,000 citizens were displaced from their homes within a two-mile (three kilometer) radius.

Geography

Maryville is located in north-central Blount County in the foothills of the Great Smoky Mountains. Chilhowee Mountain, the outermost ridge of the Western Smokies, rises prominently to the south. Chilhowee's eastern flank— known locally as "The Three Sisters"— is visible from almost anywhere in the city, and dominates the southern horizon along US-321 between Maryville and Walland. Maryville is bordered on the north by Maryville's twin city, Alcoa. A number of small suburbs— including Wildwood, Ellejoy, and Clover Hill— surround Maryville to the east and west.

Major streets
 Broadway, the main street of the downtown area, is an alignment of U.S. Route 411 and partly of U.S. Route 129. It continues to Sevierville to the east and Monroe County to the west.
 Lamar Alexander Parkway, an alignment of U.S. Route 321, continues to Lenoir City to the west and Townsend and the Great Smoky Mountains National Park to the east.
 Maryville-Alcoa Bypass, an alignment of U.S. Route 129 and part of the primary route between Maryville and Knoxville
 Montvale Road (State Route 336)
 Morganton Road, which runs parallel to US 411, connects Maryville to Greenback and the old Morganton area to west.
 Cusick Street crosses Broadway at the center of the downtown area. It extends north through Alcoa toward Louisville.
 Washington Street (State Route 35)

Parks

 Maryville Alcoa Greenway
 Bicentennial Greenbelt Park
 Amerine Park
 Everett Park
 John Sevier Park
 Pearson Springs Park
 Sandy Springs Park
 Jarvis Park

Demographics

2020 census

As of the 2020 United States census, there were 31,907 people, 10,719 households, and 7,132 families residing in the city.

2010 census
As of the census of 2010, there were 27,465 people, 10,712 households, and 7,028 families. The population density was 1,634.8 people per square mile (631.2/km2). There were 11,679 housing units at an average density of 637.6 per square mile (246.2/km2). The racial makeup of the city was 92.0% White, 3.2% Black, 0.3% Native American, 1.55% Asian, 0.03% Pacific Islander, 0.53% from other races, and 1.8% from two or more races. Hispanic or Latino of any race were 3.2% of the population.

There were 10,712 households, out of which 32.0% had children under the age of 18 living with them, 48.6% were married couples living together, 12.8% had a female householder with no husband present, and 34.4% were non-families. 30.4% of all households were made up of individuals, and 29.7% had someone living alone who was 65 years of age or older. The average household size was 2.41 and the average family size was 3.00.

In the city, the population was spread out, with 24.2% under the age of 18, 6.8% from 20 to 24, 24.2% from 25 to 44, 24.4% from 45 to 64, and 17.1% who were 65 years of age or older. The median age was 39.1 years. For every 100 females, there were 88.0 males.

The median income for a household in the city was $46,394, and the median income for a family was $61,227. Males had a median income of $31,478 versus $20,418 for females. The per capita income for the city was $23,579. About 9.0% of families and 10.2% of the population were below the poverty line, including 12.3% of those under age 18 and 3.1% of those age 65 or over.

Climate
Average temperatures in July range from 69 degrees low to 87 degrees high. Average temperatures in January range from 29 degrees low to 46 degrees high. Most of the year is very pleasant with mild temperatures.

Economy

Top employers
According to Maryville's 2020 Comprehensive Annual Financial Report, the top employers in the area were:

Education

City
Maryville City Schools operates public schools.
 Coulter Grove Intermediate School
 Foothills Elementary School
 John Sevier Elementary School
 Maryville High School
 Montgomery Ridge Intermediate School
 Maryville Junior High School (formerly Maryville Middle School)
 Sam Houston Elementary School

Private or parochial
 Maryville Christian School
 Apostolic Christian Academy
 Clayton Bradley Academy

Maryville College
Maryville is home to Maryville College, a private four-year liberal arts college. It was founded in 1819 by Presbyterian minister Isaac L. Anderson for the purpose of furthering education and enlightenment and whose mission was to do good on the largest possible scale. The college is one of the fifty oldest colleges in the United States and the twelfth oldest institution in the South. It is associated with the Presbyterian Church (USA). It enrolls about 1,103 students. Maryville College's mascot is the Scots. The sports teams compete in NCAA Division III athletics in the USA South Athletic Conference and formerly the Great South Athletic Conference.

Other colleges
 Satellite campus of Pellissippi State Community College

Weekend programs
The East Tennessee Japanese School (イーストテネシー補習授業校 Īsuto Teneshī Hoshū Jugyō Kō), a weekend Japanese education program, holds its classes at Maryville College.

Notable people
 Lamar Alexander, senior U.S. senator from Tennessee; former Governor of Tennessee, Secretary of Education and Republican presidential candidate
 Isaac L. Anderson, founder of Maryville College
 Candace Barley, youngest player to compete on the US national rugby team and play in international match, and holds the title of most-capped U20 player in the country.
 Albert Brigance, author and special education resource specialist
 Charles W. Cansler, educator and civil rights advocate
 Randall Cobb, NFL football player (born in Maryville, but played high school football at Alcoa)
 Mike Cross, musician
 Edwin Cunningham, US Consul General in Shanghai (1920-1935)
 Mark Doty, poet and memoirist
 David L. Eubanks, Christian preacher and president of Johnson Bible College
 Phillip Fulmer, former Tennessee Volunteers football coach (1992–2008)
 Guy Garman, scuba diver
 Jack Greene, country music singer, famous for his #1 hit "There Goes My Everything".
 George Washington Harris, humorist; lived near what is now Wildwood, c. 1839–1843
 Sam Houston, Texas revolutionary, politician and governor of Tennessee and Texas; lived in Maryville intermittently c. 1808—1813
 Lee Humphrey, college basketball player
 Melanie Hutsell, television and movie actress
 Roy Kramer, former commissioner of the Southeastern Conference
 Annie Law (died 1889), conchologist
 Jackie Lee, country music singer
 Mike Matzek, All-American gymnast
 Wayne McClure, American football player
 Danny Spradlin, American football player
 Charles McCallon Alexander, nineteenth century gospel singer
 William Bennett Scott Sr.
 Doc Severinsen, trumpeter

See also

 Clover Hill Mill

References

External links

 Official website
 Maryville City Schools
 City charter

 
Cities in Tennessee
Cities in Blount County, Tennessee
County seats in Tennessee
Knoxville metropolitan area
History of Tennessee
Populated places established in 1785